Capellini is a thin variety of Italian pasta, with a diameter ranging from . It is made in the form of long, thin strands, similar to spaghetti. It is often sold in a nest-like shape.

Capelli d'angelo has been popular in Italy since at least the 14th century and is known for its delicate, light texture. Due to its thinness, it is best suited for soups or dishes with light sauces, such as those made with seafood or vegetables. It is also a popular choice for dishes with Asian-inspired flavors, as it can easily absorb the flavors of the accompanying ingredients.

See also 
 Italian cuisine
 List of pasta
 Vermicelli
 Cuisine of Liguria
 List of Italian dishes
 Pasta shapes
 Italian-American cuisine

References 

Cuisine of Liguria
Types of pasta